Sturgeon Lake is a lake located  south of Tomiko and  north-east of Highway 11 / Trans-Canada Highway in the Nipissing District of northeastern Ontario, Canada. It is in geographic Stewart Township and is part of the Great Lakes Basin.

The lake flows west through a  channel into Little Tomiko Lake; the Ontario Northland Railway line from North Bay to Cochrane crosses that channel. Little Tomiko Lake empties via the Little Tomiko River, the Tomiko River, the Sturgeon River, Lake Nipissing, and the French River to Georgian Bay on Lake Huron.

See also
List of lakes in Ontario

References

Lakes of Nipissing District